Kevin McCormack may refer to:

 Kevin McCormack (dancer) (born 1970), Irish dancer
 Kevin McCormack (radio personality) (born 1960), American radio personality